The 1979 Ithaca Bombers football team was an American football team that represented Ithaca College as a member of the Independent College Athletic Conference (ICAC) during the 1979 NCAA Division III football season. In their 13th season under head coach Jim Butterfield, the Bombers compiled an 11–2 record and won the NCAA Division III championship.

Ithaca's 1979 season was part of a school-record 18-game winning streak. The streak commenced on October 27, 1979, and continued through the 1980 regular season, ending with a loss to Dayton in the 1980 NCAA Division III championship game.

Three Ithaca players were named to the NCAA Division III All-America football team as selected by the sports information directors. Senior center and co-captain Bill George and senior linebacker and co-captain John Laper were both named to the first team. Senior running back John Nicolo totaled 880 rushing yards and was named to the second team.  Laper led the team with 173 tackles (61 unassisted) and five interceptions and also received first-team honors from the American Football Coaches Association on the Kodak College Division All-America team.

The team played its home games at South Hill Field in Ithaca, New York.

Schedule

References

Ithaca
Ithaca Bombers football seasons
NCAA Division III Football Champions
Ithaca Bombers football